ι Pictoris, Latinized from Iota Pictoris, is a suspected multiple star system in the southern Pictor constellation. It is visible to the naked eye as a dim, yellow-white-hued point of light with a combined apparent visual magnitude of 5.28. They are located at a distance of around 127–131 light-years from the Sun, based on parallax.

The two visible components appear as F-type main-sequence stars: the magnitude 5.63 component A has a stellar classification of F0 V, while the cooler, fainter secondary is of class F4 V. Both are themselves are suspected spectroscopic binary stars consisting of roughly equal components. Component B actually has a higher estimated mass than Component A, although the radius of B is smaller. They are both more luminous than the Sun, and have an estimated age of around 500–600 million years.

References

F-type main-sequence stars
Binary stars
Spectroscopic binaries

Pictor (constellation)
Pictoris, Iota
Durchmusterung objects
31203 4
022531 4
1563 4